This is a list of governors for Östergötland County of Sweden, from 1693 to present.

Footnotes

References

Ostergotland